Antaeotricha graphopterella is a moth in the family Depressariidae. It was described by Francis Walker in 1864. It is found in Amazonas, Brazil.

Adults are a pale cinereous-fawn colour, the forewings with three blackish oblique streaks, the first and second streaks zigzag and the first extending from the middle of the base, more oblique than the second and than the third. There is a row of black points along the exterior border and along the adjacent part of the costa. The hindwings are brown with the fringe paler.

References

Moths described in 1864
graphopterella
Moths of South America